OJSC Kremenchukmyaso is a Ukrainian Private Joint-stock Company that belongs to a Finances and Credit Group.

Sponsorship
Kremenchukmyaso currently sponsor football Kremin and Vorskla.

References

External links
Official website

Food and drink companies of Ukraine
Economy of Kremenchuk